Sainte-Mélanie is a municipality in the Lanaudière region of Quebec, Canada, part of the Joliette Regional County Municipality. It is located along the western shores of the L'Assomption River.

History
Sainte-Mélanie was formerly part of the territory of the Ailleboust Seignory, granted to Jean d'Ailleboust d'Argenteuil (1694-1785) in 1736. By 1800, Pierre-Louis Panet (1761-1812) was Lord of Ailleboust, whose daughter Charlotte-Mélanie Panet (1794-1872) may have been the source of the name Sainte-Mélanie, also a reference to Melania the Younger (383-439). Charlotte-Mélanie's husband, Marc-Antoine-Louis Lévesque (1782-1833), donated the land in 1814 for a chapel that was eventually built in 1830. The Parish of Sainte-Mélanie was founded in 1832, and four years later in 1836, the post office opened under the name Daillebout.

The municipality officially started in 1845, was soon after abolished, and reestablished in 1855 as Sainte-Mélanie-d'Ailleboust. In 1881, the post office was renamed to Sainte-Mélanie, and more than a century later in 1986, the municipality followed suit by also adopting this shortened name.

Demographics
Population trend:
 Population in 2021: 3250 (2016 to 2021 population change: 8.7%)
 Population in 2016: 2989 
 Population in 2011: 2892 
 Population in 2006: 2765
 Population in 2001: 2633
 Population in 1996: 2474
 Population in 1991: 2282

Private dwellings occupied by usual residents: 1,394 (total dwellings: 1,518)

Mother tongue:
 English as first language: 0.9%
 French as first language: 97.8%
 English and French as first language: 0%
 Other as first language: 1.3%

Education

Commission scolaire des Samares operates francophone public schools, including:
 École Sainte-Hélène

The Sir Wilfrid Laurier School Board operates anglophone public schools, including:
 Joliette Elementary School in Saint-Charles-Borromée
 Joliette High School in Joliette

Notable people from Sainte-Mélanie

Aimé Pelletier (1914-2010), surgeon and well-known Quebec novelist, under the pen name of Bertrand Vac.  Pelletier, who spent the majority of his professional career in Montreal, is interred with his ancestors at the Sainte-Mélanie cemetery.

See also
List of municipalities in Quebec

References

Incorporated places in Lanaudière
Municipalities in Quebec